"You Are the Sunshine of My Life" is a 1973 single released by Stevie Wonder. The song became Wonder's third number-one single on the Billboard Hot 100 chart and his first number-one on the Easy Listening chart. It won Wonder a Grammy Award for Best Male Pop Vocal Performance, and was nominated for both Record of the Year and Song of the Year. This song was the second single (following "Superstition") released from the 1972 album entitled Talking Book, which stayed at number one on the R&B albums chart for three weeks.

Rolling Stone ranks the song at number 183 on their list of the "500 Greatest Songs of All Time". Billboard called it "a soft, haunting ballad with outstanding electric piano runs and outstanding production work."

Background
The first two lines of the song are sung, not by Wonder, but by Jim Gilstrap; Lani Groves sings the next two. Gilstrap and Groves, together with Gloria Barley, also provide backing vocals. The single version of the song differs from the album version with the addition of horns to the mix; this version is also included in the greatest hits compilation album Stevie Wonder's Original Musiquarium I (1982).

Reception
Cash Box said that Wonder "changes the pace [from 'Superstition'] and delivers a stirring ballad performance that is also certain to go gold instantly."

Personnel
Source: Talking Book, Tamla: T 319L, October 27, 1972 (album cover)

Stevie Wonder – lead vocal, background vocal, Fender Rhodes, drums
Jim Gilstrap – first lead vocal, background vocal
Lani Groves – second lead vocal, background vocal
Gloria Barley – background vocal
Scott Edwards – electric bass
Daniel Ben Zebulon – congas
unknown — horns

Chart performance

Weekly charts

Year-end charts

Certifications

See also
List of Hot 100 number-one singles of 1973 (U.S.)
List of number-one adult contemporary singles of 1973 (U.S.)

References

External links
 Smith, Giles, "Lives of the great songs: Nobody does it better: You are the sunshine of my life: Every supper-club singer under the sun has had a go at Stevie Wonder's 1972 classic. And none has cracked it...", The Independent, July 31, 1993.
 "You Are the Sunshine of My Life" at Songfacts.
 

1972 songs
1973 singles
Stevie Wonder songs
Songs written by Stevie Wonder
Billboard Hot 100 number-one singles
Cashbox number-one singles
Grammy Award for Best Male Pop Vocal Performance
Motown singles
Tamla Records singles
Song recordings produced by Stevie Wonder